Stirling Square
may refer to: -

 Stirling Square Capital Partners
 Stirling Square (Guildford) in Guildford, Western Australia